Tomáš Šmíd was the defending champion, but lost in the final to Anders Järryd. The score was 6–3, 6–3, 2–6, 6–2.

Seeds

Draw

Finals

Top half

Bottom half

References

External links
 Official results archive (ATP)
 Official results archive (ITF)

Dutch Open (tennis)
1984 Grand Prix (tennis)